Highway 943 is a provincial highway in the north-west region of the Canadian province of Saskatchewan. It runs from the settlement of Meetoos, where it continues as Highway 698, to Highway 942 north-west of Big River.

Highway 943 intersects Highway 945 and Highway 946, as well as an access road to the Island Lake Recreation Site on Island Lake.

See also 
Roads in Saskatchewan
Transportation in Saskatchewan

References 

943